State of Mind EP  is the first studio album by the English alternative rock band Clockwork Radio. Produced by the band, the album was released on 4 July 2010 on the band's own label, Poly Tune.

Track listing

Members
Rich Williams - vocals, guitar
Dan Wiebe - percussion
Iwan Jones - vocals, guitar
Nadim Mirshak - vocals, bass
Sam Quinn - piano, synths

External links
 Clockwork Radio (Official Website)

2010 EPs